Ronny Kobo (born March 30, 1981)  is an American fashion designer creator of the eponymous brand Torn by Ronny Kobo, Ronny Kobo, and Petersyn. Kobo is a resident of New York and recognized supporter of the arts.

References 

1980 births
Living people
American fashion designers